The 1979–80 West Midlands (Regional) League season was the 80th in the history of the West Midlands (Regional) League, an English association football competition for semi-professional and amateur teams based in the West Midlands county, Shropshire, Herefordshire, Worcestershire and southern Staffordshire.

Premier Division

The Premier Division featured all the 18 clubs which competed in the division last season, along with four new clubs.
Clubs transferred from the Midland Football Combination:
Blakenall
Malvern Town
Sutton Coldfield Town

Plus:
Shifnal Town, promoted from Division One

League table

References

External links

1979–80
8